David A. Turner (born 26 January 1946) is a British computer scientist. He is best known for designing and implementing three programming languages, including the first for functional programming based on lazy evaluation, combinator graph reduction, and polymorphic types: SASL (1972), Kent Recursive Calculator (KRC) (1981), and the commercially supported Miranda (1985). Miranda had a strong influence on the later Haskell.

He has a Doctor of Philosophy (D.Phil.) from the University of Oxford. He has held professorships at Queen Mary College, London, University of Texas at Austin and the University of Kent at Canterbury, where he has spent most of his career and retains the title of Emeritus Professor of Computation.

He was involved with developing international standards in programming and informatics, as a member of the International Federation for Information Processing (IFIP) IFIP Working Group 2.1 on Algorithmic Languages and Calculi, which specified, maintains, and supports the programming languages ALGOL 60 and ALGOL 68.

He is also an Emeritus Professor at Middlesex University, England.

Publications
 Turner, David A. SASL language manual. Tech. rept. CS/75/1. Department of Computational Science, University of St. Andrews 1975.
 
 Another Algorithm for Bracket Abstraction, D. A. Turner, Journal of Symbolic Logic, 44(2):267–270, 1979.
 Functional Programming and its Applications, D. A. Turner, Cambridge University Press 1982.
 A Parser Generator for use with Miranda, ACM Symposium on Applied Computing, pages 401–407, Philadelphia, USA, Feb 1996.
 Elementary Strong Functional Programming, D. A. Turner, in R. Plasmeijer, P. Hartel, eds, "First International Symposium on Functional Programming Languages in Education", Lecture Notes in Computer Science, volume 1022, pages 1–13, Springer-Verlag, 1996.
 Ensuring Streams Flow, Alastair Telford and David Turner, in Johnson, ed., "Algebraic Methodology and Software Technology", 6th International Conference, AMAST '97, Sydney Australia, December 1997, Lecture Notes in Computer Science, volume 1349, pages 509–523. AMAST, Springer-Verlag, December 1997.
 Ensuring the Productivity of Infinite Structures, A.J.Telford, D.A.Turner, "Technical Report TR 14-97", 37 pages, Computing Laboratory, University of Kent, March 1998. Under submission to "Journal of Functional Programming".
 Ensuring Termination in ESFP, A. J. Telford and D. A. Turner, in "15th British Colloquium in Theoretical Computer Science", page 14, Keele, April 1999. To appear in "Journal of Universal Computer Science".
 A Hierarchy of Elementary Languages with Strong Normalisation Properties, A.J.Telford, D.A.Turner, "Technical Report TR 2-00", 66 pages, University of Kent Computing Laboratory, January 2000.
 Total Functional Programming, Keynote address, pp 1–15, SBLP 2004, Rio de Janeiro, May 2004.
 Church's Thesis and Functional Programming, in A. Olszewski ed., "Church's Thesis after 70 years'", pages 518-544, Ontos Verlag, 2006.

References

External links
 , University of Kent at Canterbury
 Archive copy of an old staff page at Middlesex University
 Miranda functional programming language

Living people
Academics of Queen Mary University of London
Academics of the University of Kent
Academics of Middlesex University
British computer scientists
Members of the Department of Computer Science, University of Oxford
Alumni of Brasenose College, Oxford
Programming language designers
Programming language researchers
1946 births